Phallaria is the scientific name of two genera of organisms and may refer to:

Phallaria (moth), a genus of moths in the Geometridae
Phallaria (plant), a genus of plants in the Rubiaceae